The Symphony No. 15 in A major, Op. 141, composed between late 1970 and July 29, 1971, is the final symphony by Dmitri Shostakovich. It was his first purely instrumental and non-programmatic symphony since the Tenth from 1953. Shostakovich began to plan and sketch the Fifteenth in late 1970, with the intention of composing for himself a cheerful work to mark his 65th birthday the next year. After completing the sketch score in April 1971, he wrote the orchestral score in June while receiving medical treatment in the town of Kurgan. The symphony was completed the following month at his summer dacha in Repino. This was followed by a prolonged period of creative inactivity which did not end until the composition of the Fourteenth Quartet in 1973.

The Fifteenth Symphony was first performed privately in a reduction for two pianos for members of the Union of Soviet Composers and invited guests in August 1971. Its scheduled world premiere in September was postponed when Shostakovich suffered his second heart attack earlier that month. Following a two-month hospitalization, Shostakovich recovered well enough to attend rehearsals for the Fifteenth's premiere starting in late December 1971. The premiere took place in Moscow on January 8, 1972, performed by the All-Union Radio and Television Symphony Orchestra conducted by Maxim Shostakovich. The Western hemisphere premiere took place in Philadelphia on September 28, 1972 with the Philadelphia Orchestra conducted by Eugene Ormandy. Immediate critical reaction to the symphony was overwhelmingly positive in the Soviet Union, but mixed in the West.

Shostakovich's extensive use of musical quotation in the Fifteenth has attracted speculation since its premiere. He initially likened the first movement to a "toyshop," but later cautioned listeners against taking his description too precisely. A quotation from Gioacchino Rossini's William Tell Overture recurs throughout the first movement, while the last movement quotes from a song by Mikhail Glinka and from Richard Wagner's Götterdämmerung and Tristan und Isolde. Critics have also detected in the symphony further quotations and allusions, from other composers as well as Shostakovich's own music. Bernard Jacobson wrote in 1972 that the symphony's lasting appeal was secured because it made use of "one of [Shostakovich's] greatest expressive assets—a teasing and often powerfully affective emotional ambivalence."

History

Composition

Shostakovich began to prepare the Fifteenth Symphony in late 1970. It was originally planned as a present to himself for his 65th birthday. He wrote to Boris Tishchenko that he wanted to write a "merry symphony." Shostakovich completed a sketch outline of the Fifteenth Symphony totaling 18 pages, which used spare notation and extensive shorthand, by no later than April 2, 1971. The sketch manuscript also includes an unfinished and still unpublished setting of Yevgeny Yevtushenko's "Yelabuga Nail," a poem about the suicide of Marina Tsvetayeva.

That June, Shostakovich traveled with his wife to the clinic of Gavriil Ilizarov in Kurgan to continue treatment for his poliomyelitis, which he had been receiving since 1968. While there he began the final draft of the Fifteenth Symphony. He wrote to Marietta Shaginyan that he was working himself to the "verge of tears":

Shostakovich later made similar remarks to Sofia Khentova, telling her that the symphony did not "allow [him] a moment's rest":

Veniamin Basner recalled that the composer complained to him that work on the finale progressed too slowly.

Shostakovich continued work on the symphony after he left the clinic for his summer dacha in Repino. On July 13, he was visited there by his friend Isaak Glikman, to whom the composer declared that he had completed the first two movements and was working on the third. Shostakovich told him that he still had to "put together a finale, but, you know, somewhat like my Ninth, the symphony lacks a basic idea." Shostakovich completed the symphony on July 29 in the presence of Basner. "The new symphony is still warm and I like it," Shostakovich told Glikman. "But, perhaps after some time has gone by, I will think about it differently." In a letter to Krzysztof Meyer dated September 16, Shostakovich said: "I finished another symphony—my Fifteenth. Maybe I should not compose anymore, but I cannot live without it." Shostakovich wrote to Shaginyan on August 26 that the completion of the symphony he had "worked on day and night" left him feeling as if in a void. Aside from an arrangement of the "Serenade" by Gaetano Braga (intended for use in an unrealized projected opera based on Anton Chekhov's "The Black Monk"), Shostakovich endured a prolonged bout of writer's block after the completion of the Fifteenth Symphony, which ended in March 1973 with the composition of the Fourteenth Quartet.

Premiere

Shortly after Shostakovich completed the Fifteenth, he informed his son Maxim, to whom its premiere was eventually entrusted. Kirill Kondrashin, the composer's first choice, had suddenly been stricken with severe heart problems that summer and was unable to conduct. On the same day that Shostakovich completed the symphony, he and his wife returned home to Moscow. There he heard the symphony for the first time, played by Boris Tchaikovsky and Mieczysław Weinberg in a reduction for two pianos.

The completed score of the Fifteenth Symphony was sent to copyists at the Union of Soviet Composers by September 9 in preparation for its world premiere, which had been announced for autumn 1971. A few days later, on September 17, Shostakovich suffered his second heart attack, which required the postponement of the symphony's first performance. He was in the hospital until November 28, whereupon he was released to continue recovery at a sanatorium in Barvikha. Despite continued weakness in Shostakovich's arms and legs, his health had recovered sufficiently to allow him to attend the rehearsals for the rescheduled premiere.  It eventually took place at the Large Hall of the Moscow Conservatory on January 8, 1972, performed by the All-Union Radio and Television Symphony Orchestra under the direction of Maxim Shostakovich; he also conducted the British premiere with the New Philharmonia Orchestra on November 20, 1972. Leopold Stokowski had vied for the rights to conduct the American premiere, but lost to Eugene Ormandy, who performed it with the Philadelphia Orchestra on September 28, 1972.

Music
The symphony consists of four movements, the middle two played without interruption.

A typical performance lasts approximately 45 minutes.

The first movement begins with two chimes on the glockenspiel, followed by a five-note motif on solo flute, accompanied by pizzicato strings. This leads into a galloping motif for trumpet constructed out of all twelve notes of the Western chromatic scale. Hugh Ottaway observed that Shostakovich's use of such motifs in this symphony create an "enlarged tonal field in which 'chromatic' and 'diatonic' cease to be meaningful distinctions." Recurring throughout the movement are quotations from Gioacchino Rossini's overture to his opera William Tell. 

A brass chorale opens the second movement, which gives way to a cello solo. These themes alternate with a dotted funereal motif introduced by a pair of solo flutes, then taken up by a solo trombone, which builds up to a fortississimo climax. A muted string restatement of the opening chorale fades away on a timpani roll, after which bassoons announce the start of the scherzando third movement. 

The finale contains several quotations, starting with the "fate motif" from Richard Wagner's Der Ring des Nibelungen, then the opening motif from his Tristan und Isolde, before segueing into a reminiscence of Mikhail Glinka's "Do Not Tempt Me Needlessly." A passacaglia theme which has drawn commentary for its resemblance to the march from Shostakovich's Seventh Symphony builds to another powerful climax. The symphony ends with the celesta restating the symphony's opening motif, followed by an open A-major chord sustained over a percussion part that recalls the scherzo of his Fourth Symphony, which is finally resolved by a three-octave C-sharp.

Instrumentation
The orchestra consists of the following instruments.

Woodwinds
Piccolo
2 Flutes
2 Oboes
2 Clarinets in A
2 Bassoons

Brass
4 Horns
2 Trumpets
3 Trombones
Tuba

Percussion
4 timpani
Triangle
Castanets
Woodblock
Whip
Tom-Tom (soprano)
Snare Drum
Cymbals
Bass Drum
Tam-Tam
Glockenspiel
Xylophone
Vibraphone

Keyboards
Celesta

Strings
1st Violins
2nd Violins
Violas
Cellos
Double Basses

The Fifteenth Symphony's use of extended percussion section aside, it is scored for forces smaller than those employed in Shostakovich's First. The composer indicated in the score that the number of instruments listed were the minimum required, but "if there are more, then it would be better."

Reception

Upon hearing its first performance, Shostakovich remarked that he had composed a "wicked symphony." It was received with an ovation by the audience at its premiere. Among its admirers was his friend Marietta Shaginyan, who after the first performance made the sign of the cross over him and exclaimed: "You must not say, Dmitri Dmitrievich, that you are not well. You are well, because you have made us happy!" Tikhon Khrennikov praised the symphony as one of Shostakovich's "most profound," adding that it was "full of optimism [and] belief in man's inexhaustible strength." The first movement drew especial praise from Norman Kay in England, who called it a "tour-de-force of concentration, self-dissolution, and musical economy." Eric Roseberry noted that the symphony's instrumental timbres and use of passacaglia suggested that Shostakovich had been influenced by the late operas of his friend, Benjamin Britten. Yevgeny Mravinsky, who led the symphony's Leningrad premiere, found himself "overwhelmed" during his study of the score, telling his wife he would continue to return to this "autobiographical" symphony until the 
"end of his days."

Shostakovich's use of quotations and allusions to various works by himself and other composers has attracted speculation since its premiere. He initially described the first movement as "childhood, just a toyshop under a cloudless sky"; later, he cautioned listeners against taking "this definition too precisely." When describing the music and the process of the symphony's composition, Shostakovich said that he still felt music the way he did as a child. While he maintained that he was unable to explain his extended use of musical quotation, he also said that he "could not, could not, not include them." He reported to Glikman and Krzysztof Meyer that he made use of "exact quotations" from Beethoven, as well as Rossini and Wagner, and that he had been under the influence of Mahler's music while he composed the symphony. According to Maxim Shostakovich, he had been urged by his father not to reveal to the orchestra at the first rehearsal that there would be a quotation from Rossini in the first movement: "I want to see their faces when they come to it."

Maxim Shostakovich expressed the opinion that to him the symphony reflected "the great philosophical problems of a man's life cycle." Later he likened the work to a "chamber symphony" which described human life through the "prison of existence." Another conductor, Kurt Sanderling, heard the music as being about loneliness and death, and that no other work by Shostakovich seemed to him so "radically horrible and cruel." Alfred Schnittke, whose own music was deeply influenced by Shostakovich, held that the Fifteenth was a "crossroads in time" where "the past enters into new relationships with the present, and, like the ghost of
Hamlet’s father, intrudes into the reality of the music and actually forms it." To Alexander Ivashkin, Shostakovich's then unusual use of quotation signaled an awareness of the impossibility of composing a "pure" symphony, with the quotations creating a web of their own correspondences atop the "traditional skeleton of the symphony."

Shostakovich's Fifteenth Symphony has also exerted influence beyond music. Director David Lynch cited it as an important influence on his 1986 film Blue Velvet: "I wrote the script to Shostakovich: No. 15 in A major. I just kept playing the same part of it, over and over again". During its filming, Lynch placed speakers on set and played the symphony in order to convey the mood he wanted. He later requested that Angelo Badalamenti compose a score for the film that was "like Shostakovich."

References

Sources

Symphonies by Dmitri Shostakovich
Compositions by Dmitri Shostakovich
Compositions in A major
1971 compositions